Garden City is an unincorporated community in Columbus Township, Bartholomew County, in the U.S. state of Indiana.

History
Garden City was founded in 1886.

Geography

References

Unincorporated communities in Bartholomew County, Indiana
Unincorporated communities in Indiana